Daniel Tinayre (14 September 1910 – 24 October 1994) was a French-born Argentine film director, screenwriter and film producer.

Moving to Buenos Aires at a young age, Tinayre directed some 23 films between 1934 and 1974, directing films such as the 1947 thriller A sangre fría (In Cold Blood) which starred actors such as Amelia Bence and Tito Alonso. He was also an acclaimed screenwriter and producer simultaneously contributing in these areas to the films he directed in Argentine cinema.

In 1949 he directed Dance of Fire, which was later entered into the 1951 Cannes Film Festival. His 1960 film La patota was entered into the 11th Berlin International Film Festival. His 1963 film The Dragonfly Is Not an Insect was entered into the 3rd Moscow International Film Festival.

In 1969 he directed Kuma Ching; his last film was to be La Mary (1974), starring then-couple Susana Giménez and boxer Carlos Monzón.

He died in 1994. His widow was the well-known actress and television host Mirtha Legrand.

Filmography

As director
 Bajo la santa Federación (1935)
 Sombras porteñas (1936)
 Mateo (1937)
 Una porteña optimista (1937)
 La hora de las sorpresas (1941) 
 Vidas marcadas (1942)
 Road of HellCamino del infierno (1946)
 A sangre fría (1947)
 Danza del fuego (1948)
 Pasaporte a Río (1948)
 La vendedora de fantasías (1950)
 Deshonra (1952)
 Tren internacional (1954)
 La bestia humana (1957)
 En la ardiente oscuridad (1959)
 La patota (1960)
 El rufián (1961)
 Bajo un mismo rostro (1962)
 La cigarra no es un bicho (1963)
 Extraña ternura (1964)
 Kuma Ching (1969)
 La Mary (1974)

References

External links
 

1910 births
1994 deaths
People from Gironde
French emigrants to Argentina
Naturalized citizens of Argentina
Argentine film directors
Argentine screenwriters
Argentine male writers
Argentine film producers
French film directors
French male screenwriters
20th-century French screenwriters
French film producers
20th-century French male writers